Kareem Rashad Sultan Khan (February 12, 1987 – August 6, 2007) was a United States Army specialist who was killed during Operation Iraqi Freedom. He is a recipient of the Bronze Star and Purple Heart for his service, and is buried in Arlington National Cemetery.

Khan was born in Neptune, New Jersey to Trinidad and Tobago-born parents, Feroze Khan and Elsheba Khan of Indian descent. He was a 2005 graduate from Southern Regional High School in the Manahawkin section of Stafford Township, New Jersey. He enlisted in the U.S. Army following his graduation and was assigned to the 1st Battalion, 23rd Infantry Regiment, 3rd Brigade, 2nd Infantry Division (Stryker Brigade Combat Team), based in Fort Lewis, Washington. 
According to the Gannett News Service, he was "spurred by the September 11 attacks on the World Trade Center [and] wanted to show that not all Muslims were fanatics and that many, like him, were willing to lay their lives down for their country, America. He enlisted immediately after graduation and was sent to Iraq in July 2006."
Khan and three other soldiers were killed when a bomb exploded while they were clearing a house—he was 20 years old. He was promoted posthumously to the rank of corporal.

His service was cited during an October 2008 interview on Meet the Press with General Colin Powell. In particular, Powell referred to a photograph in The New Yorker which showed Khan's mother by his gravestone in Arlington National Cemetery. Powell said that Khan's example refutes the anti-Muslim sentiment present in the Republican campaign during the 2008 U.S. Presidential election (q.v.), namely that being Muslim disqualifies a person from being a genuine, patriotic American, or that a Muslim could not become President.

See also

 Humayun Khan, another Muslim soldier of the U.S. Army killed during Operation Iraqi Freedom whose service came up during the 2016 U.S. presidential election

References

External links

 
  (Obituary)

1987 births
2007 deaths
American military personnel killed in the Iraq War
United States Army soldiers
American Muslims
People from Neptune Township, New Jersey
People from Stafford Township, New Jersey
Southern Regional High School alumni
Burials at Arlington National Cemetery
American people of Trinidad and Tobago descent
United States Army personnel of the Iraq War